The 1978 San Francisco State Gators football team represented San Francisco State University as a member of the Far Western Conference (FWC) during the 1978 NCAA Division II football season. Led by 18th-year head coach Vic Rowen, San Francisco State compiled an overall record of 1–9 with a mark of 0–5 in conference play, placing last out of six teams in the FWC. For the season the team was outscored by its opponents 271 to 136. The Gators played home games at Cox Stadium in San Francisco.

Schedule

Team players in the NFL
The following San Francisco State players were selected in the 1979 NFL Draft.

References

San Francisco State
San Francisco State Gators football seasons
San Francisco State Gators football